John was the seventh Archdeacon of Barnstaple, England.

References

Archdeacons of Barnstaple